Chotěboř is a town in Havlíčkův Brod District in the Vysočina Region of the Czech Republic. It has about 9,000 inhabitants. The historic town centre is well preserved and is protected by law as an urban monument zone.

Administrative parts
Villages and hamlets of Bílek, Dobkov, Klouzovy, Počátky, Příjemky, Rankov, Střížov and Svinný are administrative parts of Chotěboř.

Etymology
The name is derived from the personal name Chotěbor. There was the Chotěbor's manor, owned probably by the noble Chotěbor of Vchynice.

Geography
It lies in the Upper Sázava Hills. There are several fish ponds on the outskirts of the town.

History
The first written mention of Chotěboř is from 1265. Because of the silver mines in the vicinity, King John of Bohemia bought the village and in 1331, he promoted it to a town. It was a royal town until the end of the 15th century, when it was acquired by the Trčka of Lípa family.

During the 17th and 18th centuries, the owners often changed. Vilém Leopold Kinsky built a castle there in 1701–1702. From 1836 to 1948, the castle was owned by the  family. The castle was returned to their ownership in 1992.

Demographics

Sights

Chotěboř is known for the Chotěboř Castle. It is a Baroque building with Italian architecture elements. It contains an exposition of the town museum. The castle complex includes Chapel of the Holy Trinity and English style park.

The town square is lined by Neoclassical houses. They were built by reconstruction of the houses destroyed by fire in 1832 and the arcades were walled up. The landmark of the square is the former town hall with a typical clock tower.

The Church of Saint James the Great was built on the site of a Romanesque chapel from the 12th century, which was older than the town. The church was rebuilt many times after frequent fires. Its current form is after the Neo-Gothic reconstruction in 1894–1895.

Notable people
František Sláma (1850–1917), writer and politician
Ignát Herrmann (1854–1935), novelist, satirist and editor
Fritz Richard (1869–1933), Austrian actor and theatre director
Bohuslav Šťastný (born 1949), ice hockey player
Tomáš Zohorna (born 1988), ice hockey player
Hynek Zohorna (born 1990), ice hockey player
Gabriela Kratochvílová (born 1990), model, winner of Czech Miss 2013
Matěj Vydra (born 1992), footballer

Twin towns – sister cities

Chotěboř is twinned with:
 Tiachiv, Ukraine
 Tiszafüred, Hungary

References

External links

Cities and towns in the Czech Republic
Populated places in Havlíčkův Brod District